The following is a list of Aliʻi nui of Hawaiʻi.

The aliʻi nui is the supreme ruler (sometimes called the "King" or Moi) of the island. Aliʻi refers to the ruling class of Hawaiʻi prior to the formation of the united kingdom. Here, "Hawaiʻi" refers to the island of Hawaiʻi, also called "the Big Island".

Aliʻi nui of the Big Island 
 Pilikaʻaeia, 1110–1130
 Kukohou, 1130–1150
 Kaniuhu, 1150–1180
 Kanipahu, 1180–1210
 Kamaʻiole, usurper of Kanipahu, deposed by Kalapana, 1245–1250
 Kalapana of Hawaiʻi, 1250–1270
 Kahaʻimaoeleʻa, 1270–1300
 Kalaunuiohua, 1300–1345
 Kūʻaiwa, 1345–1375
 Kahoukapu, 1375–1405
 Kauholanuimahu, 1405–1435
 Kihanuilulumoku, 1435–1460
 Līloa, 1460–1480
 Hākau, 1480–1490
Unbroken line of rule to this point. Hakau, Liloa's first born and named heir, was overthrown by Liloa's second son Umi-a-Liloa; however, the hereditary line of Liloa is unbroken and continues.
 'Umi-a-Līloa, 1490–1525
Kealiʻiokaloa, 1525–1545
 Keawenui-a-ʻUmi, 1545–1575
 Kaikilani (female), 1575–1605
 Keakealani Kāne, 1605–1635
 Keakamāhana (female), 1635–1665
Keakealaniwahine (female), 1665–1695
 Keaweʻīkekahialiʻiokamoku, 1695–1725, co-ruler with his half-sister wife Kalanikauleleiaiwi
Hereditary line of Liloa is broken by the usurping rule of Alapainui.
 Alapaʻinui, nephew of Keaweʻīkekahialiʻiokamoku and usurper of his son; 1725–1754.
Keaweʻōpala

The usurping line of rule ends with Keaweʻopala who is killed in battle while his son and heir, Kalaimanokahoʻowaha, did survive to greet Captain James Cook. The hereditary line of Liloa resumes through the grandson of Keaweʻīkekahialiʻiokamoku, Kalaniʻōpuʻu.
 Kalaniʻōpuʻu
 Kīwalaʻō, April 1782-July 1782, Aliʻi of Kaʻū
Kalaniʻōpuʻu's line ends with the death of Kīwalaʻō by Kamehameha's forces.
 Kamehameha I

See also 
Alii Aimoku of Kauai
Alii Aimoku of Molokai
Alii Aimoku of Oahu
Alii Aimoku of Maui
Royal Governors of Hawaii
Ancient Hawaiʻi
Kingdom of Hawaiʻi

 
Hawaii (island)
Hawaii
Native Hawaiian people
People from Hawaii
Hawaiiana
Lists of people from Hawaii
Hawaiian monarchs
Polynesian titles